Robert Dossou (born 13 May 1939) is a Beninese politician. He was the foreign minister of Benin from 1993 to 1995.

References

1939 births
Living people
Foreign ministers of Benin
Beninese judges
Candidates for President of Benin